Breivik is a small fishing village in Hasvik Municipality in Troms og Finnmark county, Norway.  It is located about half-way in between the villages of Sørvær and Breivikbotn on the western end of the island of Sørøya, looking out into the Lopphavet Sea.  It is located along Norwegian County Road 882.

References

Hasvik
Villages in Finnmark
Populated places of Arctic Norway